Pleroma granulosum, synonym Tibouchina granulosa, is a species of tree in the family Melastomataceae. It is also known as purple glory tree or princess flower. It is native to Bolivia and Brazil. Because its purple-flowers bloom for most of the year, this tree is often used for gardening in Brazil, where is known by the name quaresmeira.

Cultivation
Considered as one of the most ornamental species of the tropical flora for the foliage as well as for the abundant flowering, which lasts from spring to late autumn, it is widely cultivable in the tropical and subtropical climate zones.

This tree can grow up to 10 metres in height and needs good drainage acidic soil in order to flowering. The use of an acid fertilizer is recommended. It will grow in full to partial sun, needs average water, and below freezing temperatures should be avoided.

This tree can grows in USDA hardiness zone 10b to 11 or in any areas that do not exude too much cold.

Pleroma granulosum can withstand sub-freezing temperatures for several hours, but if low temperatures extend for a longer period, they might damage the plant's leaves, stems and sprouts. When this happens, the roots usually survive and produce new upper growth the following spring. Although the plant can perform a quick recovery, it might not bloom, since it puts most of its energy into producing new stems and leaves.

References

Flora of Bolivia
Flora of Brazil
Ornamental trees
granulosum